USS Simon Lake (AS-33) was the lead ship of her class of submarine tenders in the United States Navy, named for Simon Lake, a pioneering designer of early submarines.

The ship was laid down on 7 January 1963 by the Puget Sound Naval Shipyard, Bremerton, Washington; launched on 8 February 1964; sponsored by Mrs. Cecil Ford and Mrs. Herbert Diamond; and commissioned on 7 November 1964.

Service history

Simon Lake sailed from Bremerton on 16 January 1965 for Pearl Harbor on her shakedown cruise and returned to Bremerton on 17 February for a six-week yard availability period. The Polaris submarine tender stood out of Bremerton on 16 April and proceeded to Charleston, South Carolina, via the Panama Canal.

Simon Lake arrived at Charleston on 1 May and tended submarines there until 11 July 1966. On that date, she sailed for Holy Loch, Scotland, where she relieved  as tender for Submarine Squadron 14. She operated from there until 24 May 1970 when she got underway for Charleston. In June, she sailed for Bremerton for her first overhaul since commissioning. The tender was in the yard from 6 July 1970 to March 1971 and, while there, was also converted to Poseidon missile capability.

Simon Lake arrived at the Charleston Naval Shipyard in North Charleston, South Carolina, January 1977 for extensive overhaul in one of the three drydocks.  Over a year later, the drydock was flooded, the heavy ICBM missile cranes were weight tested, and the ship sent out on a shakedown" cruise.

Simon Lake was the first submarine tender to be stationed at Kings Bay Georgia in 1979 when the base first opened and was the first tender on the east coast that women served on in the U.S. Navy. After Refresher Training (REFTRA) in Guantanamo Bay, Cuba, Simon Lake assumed duties tending submarines at the Naval Weapons Station, Goose Creek, South Carolina. In June 1979,  relieved Simon Lake at the Naval Weapons Station Charleston, South Carolina.

From 1979-1985 Simon Lake serviced submarines in Kings Bay Georgia, where she also won two Battle Efficiency 'E' awards. In September 1985 she was driven to Ingalls Shipyard in Pascagoula Mississippi where she received a stem to stern, inside and out, grind to bare metal and repaint; a replacement of the helo deck; repair of the two 3-inch/50 rear-facing guns; and the addition of a 25 mm Mk38 chain gun weapons system. She was relaunched in September 1986 at which time she did a short shakedown cruise to Guantanamo Bay until December 1986 when she returned to Charleston, South Carolina for a brief stop over to take on supplies before heading off to Holy Loch, Scotland in May 1987.

In May 1987 Simon Lake returned to Scotland to again relieve USS Hunley at Holy Loch where in 1988 and 1991, she won Battle Efficiency 'E' awards. She remained on station there until the base was closed and all assets withdrawn in 1992. Sailing for Norfolk, Virginia, in March of that year, Simon Lake drew to a close thirty years of US Navy presence in Holy Loch, Scotland.

In March 1992, Simon Lake returned to Norfolk to conduct an extensive overhaul. After completion of the overhaul and a visit to Palma, Spain in March 1993, she arrived at her new homeport of La Maddalena, Italy where she relieved . For superior service to the fleet, she received the Battle Efficiency 'E' award, Weapons Black "W"  and Meritorious Unit Commendation awards for the period 7 July 1993 - 31 August 1994.

In March 1998, the ship transited the Suez Canal to the United Arab Emirates where she supported Operation Southern Watch in the Persian Gulf. The vessel's performance in this period led to her receiving the Navy Unit Commendation and Armed Forces Expeditionary Medal. In June 1998, she returned to La Maddalena, Italy.

Simon Lakes performance during her last two years of service was particularly noteworthy.  Not only did she receive the awards associated with the Persian Gulf but she was nominated for the Secretary of Defense Maintenance Award, received the 1997 and 1998 Battle Efficiency 'E' awards, the 1998 Chief of Naval Operations Safety Award, and the 1998 Golden Anchor award, and became the first surface ship to receive both the Enlisted Surface Warfare and the Surface Warfare Officer pennants. 
 
 
Simon Lake was decommissioned on 31 July 1999 and, into 2008 was in the mothball fleet in Philadelphia.
Simon Lake was placed out of service at Norfolk Naval Shipyards in Portsmouth, Virginia as part of the Naval Inactive Ship Maintenance Facility's inventory.

Simon Lake departed Norfolk Naval Shipyard on 5 February 2015. Beginning in September 2011, Simon Lake underwent the deactivation process in preparation for dismantling. The ship was placed in the James River Reserve Fleet on 3 December 2015 in the care of the U. S. Maritime Administration to await recycling. She arrived at Steelcoast (ex-ESCO Marine) in Brownsville, Texas, for ship recycling on 27 February 2019.

Awards 
Simon Lake earned numerous awards including seven Navy E Ribbons, one Navy Unit Commendation and seven Meritorious Unit Commendations.

 1998-06-10 - 1998-12-10 – Meritorious Unit Commendation *Awarded to units assigned to 6th Fleet Battle Force
 1998-04-01 - 1998-06-04 – Armed Forces Expeditionary Medal
 1997-10-01 - 1998-09-30 – Navy E Ribbon
 1997-10-01 - 1998-04-30 – Navy Unit Commendation
 1996-10-01 - 1997-09-30 – Navy E Ribbon
 1993-07-07 - 1994-08-31 – Meritorious Unit Commendation
 1993-04-06 - 1997-04-11 – Armed Forces Service Medal
 1990-10-01 - 1991-09-30 – Navy E Ribbon
 1989-04-01 - 1989-05-20 – Secretary of the Navy Letter of Commendation *COOPEX 1-89
 1989-01-01 - 1992-06-01 – Meritorious Unit Commendation *Awarded to units assigned to Submarine Squadron 14
 1987-06-01 - 1988-12-31 – Meritorious Unit Commendation *Awarded to units assigned to Submarine Squadron 14
 1987-06-01 - 1988-12-31 – Meritorious Unit Commendation *Awarded to USMC detachment assigned to USS Simon Lake (AS-33)
 1987-06-01 - 1988-12-31 – Meritorious Unit Commendation *Awarded to units assigned to NSA Holy Lock
 1984-10-01 - 1985-09-30 – Navy E Ribbon
 1984-02-01 - 1985-10-01 – Meritorious Unit Commendation
 1983-10-01 - 1984-09-30 – Navy E Ribbon
 1981-10-01 - 1982-09-30 – Navy E Ribbon
 1980-01-01 - 1984-02-01 – Meritorious Unit Commendation
 1975-07-01 - 1976-08-12 – Meritorious Unit Commendation
 1975-07-01 - 1976-09-30 – Navy E Ribbon

See also
 Peter Dorschel

References

External links
 
 aboutsubs.com USS Simon Lake page

1964 ships
Cold War auxiliary ships of the United States
Simon Lake-class submarine tenders
Submarine tenders
United States Navy
Submarine tenders of the United States Navy